Herrema is a Dutch surname. Notable people with the surname include:

 Jennifer Herrema (born 1972), American singer, songwriter, and record producer
 Dr Tiede Herrema (1921–2020), Dutch businessman, victim of abduction in Ireland in 1975

See also
 Herrera (surname)

Dutch-language surnames